FlexATX is a motherboard form factor derived from ATX. The specification was released in 1999 by Intel as an addendum to the microATX specification. It uses a subset of the motherboard mounting holes required for microATX and the same I/O plate system as ATX and microATX.

The term is used also for the form factor of a PSU that is smaller than a standard ATX PSU and is used in small cases that host a FlexATX or Mini-ITX motherboard or in thin rackmount servers such as 1U racks.

References

External links
 Komponen motherboard lengkap

Motherboard form factors